The Armtech C30R was an assault rifle concept using 5.56mm (Quadrant with 3.56g standard M193 bullet, dimensions of the rectangular ammunition 35.7×15.8×9.5 mm) similar to the H&K G11.

See also
 Heckler & Koch G11
 Gyrojet
 Steyr ACR
 Benelli CB M2
 Voere VEC-91
 Lightweight Small Arms Technologies
 List of bullpup firearms
 List of assault rifles

References

5.56 mm assault rifles
Bullpup rifles
Trial and research firearms of Australia
Caseless firearms